Roberto D'Angelo (born 21 June 1945) is a retired Italian slalom canoeist who competed from the mid-1960s to the mid-1970s. He finished 12th in the K-1 event at the 1972 Summer Olympics in Munich.

References

1945 births
Canoeists at the 1972 Summer Olympics
Italian male canoeists
Living people
Olympic canoeists of Italy
20th-century Italian people